Bernalillo County is the most populous county in the U.S. state of New Mexico. As of the 2020 census, the population was 676,444. The county seat, Albuquerque, is the most populous city in New Mexico.

Bernalillo County is the central county of the Albuquerque, NM Metropolitan Statistical Area.

History
Bernalillo County was one of seven partidos established during Mexican rule; in 1852, within two years of the creation of the  New Mexico Territory, Bernalillo became one of that territory's nine original counties. Bernalillo County was named for the town of Bernalillo, which is currently no longer part of the county. The towns of Los Ranchos de Albuquerque and Bernalillo were previously the county seats, but the capital was finally established in Albuquerque in 1883. In 1876, it absorbed Santa Ana County.

In 1906, years after the Land Revision Act of 1891 provided for the setting aside of forest reserves, the parts of Bernalillo County currently known as Cibola National Forest were established as reserves.

USS LST-306, a World War II tank landing ship that participated in the Allied invasion of Italy, was renamed as USS Bernalillo County in 1955. Sandia Mountain Wilderness was created in 1978 and the Petroglyph National Monument was established in June 1990.

Geography
It is the third-smallest county in New Mexico by area.

Bernalillo County is in central New Mexico, and "stretches from the East Mountain area (just east of the Sandia Mountains) to the Volcano Cliffs on the west mesa."

Adjacent counties
 Sandoval County - north
 Santa Fe County - east
 Torrance County - east
 Valencia County - south
 Cibola County - west

National protected areas
 Cibola National Forest (part)
 El Camino Real de Tierra Adentro National Historic Trail (part)
 Petroglyph National Monument

Demographics

2000 census
As of the census of 2000, there were 556,678 people, 220,936 households, and 141,178 families living in the county, making Bernalillo the most populous county in the state. The population density was 477 people per square mile (184/km2). There were 239,074 housing units at an average density of 205 per square mile (79/km2). The racial makeup of the county was 70.75% White, 2.77% Black or African American, 4.16% Native American, 1.93% Asian, 0.10% Pacific Islander, 16.07% from other races, and 4.22% from two or more races.  41.96% of the population were Hispanic or Latino of any race.

There were 220,936 households, out of which 31.40% had children under the age of 18 living with them, 46.00% were married couples living together, 12.90% had a female householder with no husband present, and 36.10% were non-families. 28.50% of all households were made up of individuals, and 7.90% had someone living alone who was 65 years of age or older. The average household size was 2.47 and the average family size was 3.06.

In the county, the population was spread out, with 25.30% under the age of 18, 10.30% from 18 to 24, 30.40% from 25 to 44, 22.40% from 45 to 64, and 11.50% who were 65 years of age or older. The median age was 35 years. For every 100 females there were 95.50 males. For every 100 females age 18 and over, there were 92.90 males.

The median income for a household in the county was $38,788, and the median income for a family was $46,613. Males had a median income of $33,720 versus $26,318 for females. The per capita income for the county was $20,790.  About 10.20% of families and 13.70% of the population were below the poverty line, including 17.90% of those under age 18 and 9.10% of those age 65 or over.

2010 census
As of the 2010 United States Census, there were 662,564 people, 266,000 households, and 164,104 families living in the county. The racial makeup of the county was 69.4% white, 4.8% American Indian, 3.0% black or African American, 2.3% Asian, 0.1% Pacific islander, 16.0% from other races, and 4.4% from two or more races. Those of Hispanic or Latino origin made up 47.9% of the population. The largest ancestry groups were:

 27.6% Mexican
 18.5% Spanish
 11.6% German
 8.5% Irish
 7.6% English
 3.4% Italian
 2.6% American
 2.3% French
 1.9% Scottish
 1.7% Scotch-Irish
 1.7% Polish
 1.3% Norwegian
 1.2% Swedish
 1.1% Dutch

Of the 266,000 households, 31.9% had children under the age of 18 living with them, 41.4% were married couples living together, 14.1% had a female householder with no husband present, 38.3% were non-families, and 30.4% of all households were made up of individuals. The average household size was 2.45 and the average family size was 3.07. The median age was 35.8 years.

The median income for a household in the county was $47,481 and the median income for a family was $59,809. Males had a median income of $42,189 versus $34,432 for females. The per capita income for the county was $26,143. About 11.8% of families and 15.6% of the population were below the poverty line, including 22.8% of those under age 18 and 9.8% of those age 65 or over.

Politics

County Commission

County offices

New Mexico Senate

Congressional
Melanie Stansbury (D) is the representative for the 1st Congressional District.

Presidential
In presidential elections prior to 1992, Bernalillo County primarily voted for Republican Party candidates, only supporting three Democratic candidates in six elections total. (Franklin D. Roosevelt four times, Harry S. Truman and Lyndon B. Johnson once each). From 1992 on, the county has backed Democratic Party candidates in every presidential election. While the margins were relatively narrow from 1992 to 2004, since then the county has tilted strongly Democratic similar to many urban counties nationwide.

Communities

A local toponymic oddity is that the town of Bernalillo, north of Albuquerque, is not actually in Bernalillo County. When established in 1852, the county was named for the town of Bernalillo, which was incorporated into Sandoval County in 1903.

Bracketed number refers to location on map, right

Cities
 Albuquerque (3) (county seat)
 Rio Rancho (partial)

Town
 Edgewood (partial)

Villages
 Los Ranchos de Albuquerque (1)
 Tijeras (6)

Census-designated places

 Barton
 Carnuel (9)
 Cedar Crest (5)
 Cedro
 Chilili (8)
 Edith Endave
 Isleta (7)
 Kirtland AFB
 Manzano Springs (partial)
 North Valley (2)
 Paa-Ko
 Pajarito Mesa
 Paradise Hills
 Ponderosa Pine
 San Antonito
 Sandia Heights
 Sandia Knolls
 Sandia Park
 Sedillo
 South Valley (4)

Unincorporated communities
 Alameda
 Isleta Pueblo
 Laguna Pueblo
 Sandia Pueblo (partial)
 Zuzax

Education
There are three school districts in the county:
 Albuquerque Public Schools
 Moriarty Municipal Schools
 Rio Rancho Public Schools

Bureau of Indian Education (BIE) schools:
 Isleta Elementary School
 Albuquerque Indian School (closed)

See also
 National Register of Historic Places listings in Bernalillo County, New Mexico

References

External links
 

 
Albuquerque metropolitan area
Populated places established in 1852
1852 establishments in New Mexico Territory